The Baltimore and Ohio Railroad's sole Class N-1 steam locomotive, #5600 (named "George H. Emerson"), was the first duplex locomotive and the first 4-4-4-4 locomotive ever built.  It was designed and built by the railroad's own shops in 1937.

Cylinders 
The rear set of cylinders were placed beside the firebox. This allowed the locomotive's wheelbase to remain the same. The space beside the firebox was hot and dirty, which caused premature cylinder wear, and the placement of the cylinders limited the size of the firebox. These same problems occurred on the PRR Q1, which also placed the rear cylinders by the firebox. It was built by the B&O's own Mount Clare Shops in 1937; however it had problems with the sizes of the cylinders facing the other direction.

Retirement 
In 1943, No. 5600 was retired from service. The locomotive was then cut up for scrap in 1950.

Gallery

References

N-1
4-4-4-4 locomotives
Duplex locomotives
Experimental locomotives
Railway locomotives introduced in 1937
Steam locomotives of the United States
Scrapped locomotives
Passenger locomotives
Standard gauge locomotives of the United States